The Ning Young Building is an historic building in Victoria, British Columbia, Canada.  It is located on Fan Tan Alley, in the city's Chinatown area.

See also
 List of historic places in Victoria, British Columbia

References

External links
 

1920 establishments in British Columbia
Buildings and structures completed in 1920
Buildings and structures in Victoria, British Columbia